Jennifer Daniel (born Jennifer Ruth Williams; 23 May 1936 – 16 August 2017) was a Welsh actress. Her film appearances included assorted roles in the Edgar Wallace Mysteries film series, Gideon's Way and the Hammer horror films The Kiss of the Vampire (1963) and The Reptile (1966).

She played Mrs. Linton in the 1992 film Emily Brontë's Wuthering Heights. Her television credits include Barnaby Rudge, ITV Play of the Week, Barlow, General Hospital, Rumpole of the Bailey and The Collectors.

Personal life
Daniel was born in Pontypool, South Wales, and she was a student at the Central School of Speech in London. She was married to actor Dinsdale Landen from 1959 until his death in 2003. Jennifer Daniel died on 16 August 2017 at the age of 81 in Clapham, London.

Sources
Kinsey, Wayne A. Hammer Films: The Bray Studios Years (Reynolds & Hearn, 2002)

References

External links
 

1936 births
2017 deaths
People from Pontypool
Welsh film actresses
Welsh television actresses
20th-century Welsh actresses
21st-century Welsh actresses